is a type of Japanese arrow used by the samurai class of feudal Japan. Kabura-ya were arrows which whistled when shot and were used in ritual archery exchanges before formal medieval battles. 

Like a Wind instrument, the sound was created by a specially carved or perforated bulb of deer horn or wood attached to the tip. In English, these are often called "whistling-bulb arrows", "messenger arrows", or "signal arrows." Kabura literally translates to "turnip", and thus the Japanese term technically means "turnip[-shaped] arrows." The Chinese xiangjian (sometimes pronounced and written mingdi) was quite similar, and until the end of the Warlord Era were commonly used by bandits to announce the gang's approach.  

In Shinto, the sound made by the Kabura-ya arrow in mid-flight is thought to ward-off evil influences, and, like the Hama Ya, Hama Yumi and the Azusa Yumi, it is used is Shinto cleansing rites of sites, shrine grounds, parks, etc.

Use
In battle, particularly around the time of the Heian period, kabura-ya would be shot before a battle, to alert the enemy. The whistling sound was also believed to chase away evil spirits, and to alert friendly kami to lend their support. It was not uncommon for archery exchanges to be performed for quite some time, and in the 1183 battle of Kurikara, for example, fifteen arrows were shot by each side, then thirty, then fifty, then one hundred, before these hundred samurai on each side actually engaged one another in battle. It was also not uncommon for messages to be tied to these arrows, which could be shot into fortresses, battle camps or the like. This practice of the formal archery exchange likely died out gradually following the end of the Heian period, as war became less and less ritualized.

The arrows would also be sold at Shintō shrines as good luck charms, particularly around New Year's Day; simply carrying a kabura-ya, like a Hama Ya, is meant to serve as a ward against evil spirits.

See also
 Kasagake
 Carnyx
 Dacian Draco

References

Sources 
Frederic, Louis (2002). "Japan Encyclopedia." Cambridge, Massachusetts: Harvard University Press.
Billingsley, Phil (1988). "Bandits in Republican China" Stanford University Press

External links
Archery Gallery

Samurai weapons and equipment
Archery equipment of Japan
Arrow types 
Amulets
Talismans
Shinto in Japan
Exorcism in Shinto
Shinto religious objects
Magic items